On 6 May 1999, an election was held to choose council members for the Trafford Borough Council in Greater Manchester, England. One-third of the council members were up for election, with each successful candidate to serve a four-year term of office, expiring in 2003. The Labour Party held overall control of the council.

After the election, the composition of the council was as follows:

Summary

Ward results

References

Trafford
1999
1990s in Greater Manchester